Represent (stylized in all caps and quotemarks) is the sixth studio album by American gangsta rap group Compton's Most Wanted, and their fourth album under the CMW brand since 1992 Music to Driveby (their previous two albums, We Come Strapped and Death Threatz were billed as 'MC Eiht featuring CMW'). It was released on October 24, 2000, via Half-Ounce Records. Production was handled by DJ Raw Steele and CMW members DJ Slip and MC Eiht. It includes the singles, "This Is Compton 2000" and "Then U Gone". In 2007, MC Eiht re-released the album re-titled, Representin'. The cover art pays tribute to the N.W.A album Straight Outta Compton.

Track listing

References

External links

2000 albums
Compton's Most Wanted albums
Albums produced by MC Eiht